Inge Hvid-Møller (1912–1970) was a Danish actress and stage director. She is remembered for performing roles in Jean Anouilh's plays, in particular the title role in Antigone in 1946. From the 1950s she directed plays including Chekhov's Onkel Vanja (1953) at the Allé-Scenen. Hvid-Møller also performed in several films, including Jeg mødte en Morder (1943).

Biography
Born in Copenhagen on 6 October 1912, Inge Hvid-Møller was the daughter of the high-court attorney Johannes Hvid-Møller (1885–1959) and his wife Elna Johanne Henriette Bentzen (1884–1950). In 1941, she married the actor Hans-Henrik Krause. The marriage was dissolved in 1946. She trained at the Royal Theatre School (1932–34) and made her debut in 1935 as Esther in Henri Nathansen Indenfor Murene (Inside the Walls) in 1936.

Hvid-Møller played a number of dark tragic roles in the theatres of Copenhagen and the provinces. After a year with the Dagmarteater, she performed in Aalborg (1937–39) and Aarhus (1939–42) where she played Constance Leth in Kaj Munk's Egelykke. She returned to Copenhagen for the remainder of the German occupation, spending most of her time at the Folketeatret where she played Eliza in George Bernard Shaw's Pygmalion.

In 1946, she was particularly successful as Antigone in Anouilh's play at the Allé-Scenen theatre. From 1950 to 1956, she was engaged by the Frederiksberg Teater where she starred as Prudence in Kameliadamen and took the title roles in Anouilh's plays Jeanne d'Arc and  Medea. In the later 1950s and early 1960s, she devoted most of her time to direction, not only on the stage but also on television and radio. She staged Onkel Vanja at Allé Scenen and Nøgen at Riddersalen, also directing the latter as a TV production.

Inge Hvid-Møller died in the Frederiksberg district of Copenhagen on 18 February 1970.

Filmography

References

External links
Biography with photo from the Danish Film Institute (in Danish)

1912 births
1970 deaths
Actresses from Copenhagen
20th-century Danish actresses
Danish film actresses
Danish theatre directors